Cregmore  may refer to:

Cregmore (Lackagh parish), County Galway
Cregmore (Ardrahan parish), County Galway